The International Cinephile Society is an online organization of professional film critics and journalists worldwide. Founded in 2003, it has obtained approximately 100 members—among them are Mike D'Angelo, Justin Chang (Los Angeles Times), and Stephanie Zacharek (Time).

Led by Cédric Succivalli, each year the organization honors the finest in American and international cinema. Its nominations have been noted for being different from other awards' submissions, such as the Academy Awards. Their annual announcements have received coverage from Variety, IndieWire, and Screendaily.

Award categories
 Best Picture
 Best Director
 Best Foreign Language Film
 Best Actor
 Best Actress
 Best Supporting Actor
 Best Supporting Actress
 Best Original Screenplay
 Best Adapted Screenplay
 Best Cinematography
 Best Editing
 Best Production Design
 Best Original Score
 Best Ensemble
 Best Animated Film
 Best Documentary
 Best Breakthrough Performance

References

External links
 

American film awards
Awards established in 2003